Shankargarhi is a village located near Bajna in the district of Mathura, Uttar Pradesh, India.

Villages in Mathura district